Franz Metzner (18 November 1870, Wscherau, near Plzeň – 24 March 1919, Berlin) was an influential German sculptor, particularly his sculptural figures integrated into the architecture of Central European public buildings in the Art Nouveau / Jugendstil / Vienna Secession period. His style is difficult to classify.

Biography

Metzer learned the craft of stone-cutting in Breslau with Christian Behrens and did apprenticeships in Saxony through 1894.  He founded his own studio in Berlin in 1896 and worked predominantly for the royal porcelain factory until 1903, and became a professor at the Vienna college of arts and sciences.  Metzner achieved fame by winning a gold medal at the Paris Exposition Universelle (1900).

Among his important works are the sculptures for Josef Hoffmann's 1904–1911 landmark Vienna Secession Palais Stoclet in Brussels, including the eccentric four green male nudes at the summit of the building. The Palais Stoclet is an example of "Gesamtkunstwerk", the integration of art and architecture, one of the goals of Jugendstil, and it had notable influence on birth of Art Deco.

In 1910 Metzner met the vacationing Frank Lloyd Wright and, according to the scholarship of Anthony Alofsin, Metzer affected Wright's "conventionalization" of the human figure and its incorporation into buildings like the Larkin Building and Midway Gardens.  Around the same time, Metzner's designs influenced Czech artists working in Prague, Stanislav Sucharda among them.

A famous work is the 1913 Völkerschlachtdenkmal (People's Battle Monument), designed by the architect Bruno Schmitz in Leipzig.  Metzner executed the powerful and strangely scaled interior figural-architectural sculpture in the "Hecker Tomb" with his teacher Behrens. The Monument was inaugurated in 1913 by Kaiser Wilhelm II. It is unique and imposing combination of Wilhelmine and Jugendstil styles.

Much of Metzner's work in Germany was lost in World War II.

Other work
 Atlas figures, Zacherl House, Vienna, Austria, 1905, Jože Plečnik, architect
 Tomb for the paper manufacturer Max Krause in the Jerusalem Cemetery in Berlin, 1907, Bruno Schmitz architect
 Franz Stelzhammer Monument, Linz, Germany, 1908
 sculpture for the Ufa-Pavillon am Nollendorfplatz in Berlin, 1913, for architect Oskar Kaufmann
 Der Rüdigerbrunnen (the Rudiger well) in the Bavarian city of Kaufbeuren

References

Further reading
 Einholz, Sibylle. "Metzner, Franz." In Grove Art Online. Oxford Art Online, (accessed 4 February 2012; subscription required).
 Metzner, Franz. In: Ulrich Thieme, Felix Becker et al.: ''Allgemeines Lexikon der Bildenden Künstler von der Antike bis zur Gegenwart. Vol. 24, E. A. Seemann, Leipzig 1930, p. 448f.

External links
 
 Entry for Franz Metzner on the Union List of Artist Names
 

1870 births
1919 deaths
Deaths from Spanish flu
German sculptors
German male sculptors
Architectural sculptors
Art Nouveau sculptors
German Bohemian people
People from Plzeň-North District
20th-century sculptors
Wiener Werkstätte